Edward Mogg was a publisher in London in the 19th century. He issued maps and travel guides to London and other localities in England and Wales. Mogg's publications appear in works of fiction such as Robert Smith Surtees' Mr. Sponge's Sporting Tour and Shirley Brooks' The Naggletons.

Further reading

1800s-1810s 
 
  (map)
 
  (map)

1820s-1830s

1840s-1850s 
  + Index
 
 
 
 
 
 
 
 
 
  (map)
  (map)

References

External links

 WorldCat. Edward Mogg

Publishers (people) from London